De Bello Africo (also  Bellum Africum; On the African War) is a Latin work continuing Julius Caesar's accounts of his campaigns, De Bello Gallico and De Bello Civili, and its sequel by an unknown author De Bello Alexandrino. It details Caesar's campaigns against his Republican enemies in the province of Africa.

Authorship

De Bello Africo is preceded by De Bello Alexandrino and followed by De Bello Hispaniensi. These three works end the Caesarean corpus relating Caesar's Civil War. The historical narratives, though attributed to Caesar, are assumed to have been written by three different anonymous authors around 40 BC. Though normally collected and bound with Caesar's authentic writings, their authorship has been debated since antiquity. One very plausible theory favors Aulus Hirtius as the author of De Bello Alexandrino (see there for details). But due to considerable differences in style, scholarly consensus has ruled out the author of the latter, as well as Julius Caesar, as the author or authors of the two last parts. It has been suggested that these were in fact rough drafts prepared at the request of Hirtius by two separate soldiers who fought in the respective campaign; and had he survived, Hirtius would have worked them up into more effective literary form. There are scholars who propose that he acted as editor to these historical narratives. Regarding De Bello Africo, A.G. Way ventures: "The careful chronology and the faithful record of the feelings of the troops suggests a soldier - possibly a junior officer - who was on the spot. That he was young and inexperienced; an ardent, but not always a balanced, partisan; a keen observer of all that went on around him, but without access to the inner counsels of his C.-in-C."

See also
 Commentarii de Bello Gallico
 Commentarii de Bello Civili
 De Bello Alexandrino
 De Bello Hispaniensi
 Caesar's civil wars for an account of the campaign

References

Latin works about history
Africa (Roman province)
Depictions of Julius Caesar in literature
Works about ancient Rome